The 1916 Presbyterian Blue Hose football team represented Presbyterian College as an independent during the 1916 college football season. Led by the second-year head coach Walter A. Johnson, Presbyterian compiled a record of 4–3. The team captain was A. P. McFie.

Schedule

References

Presbyterian
Presbyterian Blue Hose football seasons
Presbyterian Blue Hose football